Hamidah, historically known as Hamudah, is a village and administrative sub-division ('uzlah) in Raydah District of 'Amran Governorate, Yemen. It is located on a small plain that sticks out to the west of the al-Bawn from a point just north of Raydah.

History 
Hamidah is an ancient settlement, with its name mentioned in several old Himyaritic inscriptions. It is mentioned in several historical sources including the Iklil and the Sifat Jazirat al-Arab, both by al-Hamdani, the Ghayat al-amani of Yahya ibn al-Husayn, the Sirat al-Hadi ila'l-Haqq of al-Abbasi, the Kitab al-Simt of Muhammad ibn Hatim al-Yami al-Hamdani, and the Muʽjam ma'staʽjam of al-Bakri. Hamidah was not the site of any major historical events, although it is mentioned in Jewish historical writings as a place where the Imam Al-Mahdi Ahmad ordered the destruction of a synagogue in the year 1678 of the Common Era.

References 

Populated places in 'Amran Governorate